Hirofumi Suga may refer to:

 Hirofumi Suga (comedian), Japanese comedian
 Hirofumi Suga (garden designer), Japanese garden designer and landscape architect